A water filter removes impurities by lowering contamination of water using a fine physical barrier, a chemical process, or a biological process. Filters cleanse water to different extents, for purposes such as: providing agricultural irrigation, accessible drinking water, public and private aquariums, and the safe use of ponds and swimming pools.

Methods of filtration

Filters use sieving, adsorption, ion exchanges, biofilms and other processes to remove unwanted substances from water. Unlike a sieve or screen, a filter can potentially remove particles much smaller than the holes through which its water passes, such as nitrates or germs like Cryptosporidium.

Among the methods of filtration, notable examples are sedimentation, used to separate hard and suspended solids from water and activated charcoal treatment, where the boiled water is poured through a piece of cloth to trap undesired residuals. Additionally, the use of machinery to work on desalinization and purification of water through the transposal of it into multiple-filtration water tanks. This technique is aimed at the filtration of water on bigger scales, such as serving entire cities.

These three methods are particularly relevant, as they trace back to centuries and are the base for many of the modern methods of filtration utilized today.

Types

Water treatment plant filters

Types of water filters include media filters, screen filters, disk filters, slow sand filter beds, rapid sand filters, cloth filters, and biological filters such as algae scrubbers.

Point-of-use filters

Point-of-use filters for home use include granular-activated carbon filters used for carbon filtering, depth filter, metallic alloy filters, microporous ceramic filters, carbon block resin, microfiltration and ultrafiltration membranes. Some filters use more than one filtration method. An example of this is a multi-barrier system. Jug filters can be used for small quantities of drinking water. Some kettles have built-in filters, primarily to reduce limescale build-up.

Some common substances that point-of-use filtration does not remove include arsenic, bacteria, chlorides, fluoride, nitrates, perechlorates, pharmaceuticals, sodium and viruses.

Portable water filters

Water filters are used by hikers, aid organizations during humanitarian emergencies, and the military. These filters are usually small, portable and lightweight ( or less). These usually filter water by working a mechanical hand pump, although some use a siphon drip system to force water through, while others are built into water bottles. Dirty water is pumped via a screen-filtered flexible silicon tube through a specialized filter, ending up in a container. These filters work to remove bacteria, protozoa and microbial cysts that can cause disease. Filters may have fine meshes that must be replaced or cleaned, and ceramic water filters must have its outside abraded when they have become clogged with impurities.

These water filters should not be confused with devices or tablets that disinfect water, which remove or kill viruses such as hepatitis A and rotavirus.

Ceramic water filters

Ceramic filters represent low-cost solutions to water filtration and are widely adhered to despite being one of the oldest methods of filtration. These filters are found not only inside the homes of families but also utilized in industrial engineering (as high-temperature filters) for several processes.

The conventional ceramic filters used for day-to-day water consumption, known as candle-type filters, work with gravity and a central candle, which makes the filtration process significantly long.

Water polishing
The term water polishing can refer to any process that removes small (usually microscopic) particulate material, or removes very low concentrations of dissolved material from water.  The process and its meaning vary from setting to setting: a manufacturer of aquarium filters may claim that its filters perform water polishing by capturing "micro particles" within nylon or polyester pads, just as a chemical engineer can use the term to refer to the removal of magnetic resins from a solution by passing the solution over a bed of magnetic particulate. In this sense, water polishing is simply another term for whole house water filtration systems. Polishing is also done on a large scale in water reclamation plants.

History

4000 years ago, in India and China, Hindus devised the first drinking water standards. Hindus heated dirty water by boiling it and exposing it to sunlight or dipping it seven times in hot pieces of copper, then filtering it through earthen vessels and cooling it. This was an enlightened procedure to obtain sterilized drinking water as well as to keep it aesthetically pleasing. This method was directed at individuals and households rather than for use as a community water source. The Egyptians first discovered the principle of coagulation in water treatment after 1500 BC. They adapted a chemical called alum for the settling of suspended particles. 

Until the invention of the microscope, the existence of microscopic life was undiscovered. More than 200 years passed before the microscope was invented and the relationship between microorganisms and disease became clear. In the mid-19th century, cholera was proven to be transmitted by contaminated water. In the late 19th century, Louis Pasteur's theory of the particulate pathogen finally established a causal relationship between microorganisms and disease. Filtration as a method of water purification was established in the 18th century, and the first municipal water treatment plant was built in Scotland in 1832. However, the aesthetic value of water was important at the time, and effective water quality standards did not exist until the late 19th century.

2,000 years ago, Mayan drinking water filtration systems used crystalline quartz and zeolite. Both minerals are used in modern water filtration. "The filters would have removed harmful microbes, nitrogen-rich compounds, heavy metals such as mercury and other toxins from the water".

Persian engineer Al-Karaji wrote a book, The Extraction of Hidden Waters, which gave an early description of a water filtration process.
During the 19th and 20th centuries, water filters for domestic water production were generally divided into slow sand filters and rapid sand filters (also called mechanical filters and American filters).  While there were many small-scale water filtration systems prior to 1800, Paisley, Scotland is generally acknowledged as the first city to receive filtered water for an entire town.  The Paisley filter began operation in 1804 and was an early type of slow sand filter.  Throughout the 1800s, hundreds of slow sand filters were constructed in the UK and on the European continent.  An intermittent slow sand filter was constructed and operated at Lawrence, Massachusetts in 1893 due to continuing typhoid fever epidemics caused by sewage contamination of the water supply. The first continuously operating slow sand filter was designed by Allen Hazen for the city of Albany, New York in 1897. The most comprehensive history of water filtration was published by Moses N. Baker in 1948 and reprinted in 1981.

In the 1800s, mechanical filtration was an industrial process that depended on the addition of aluminium sulfate prior to the filtration process.  The filtration rate for mechanical filtration was typically more than 60 times faster than slow sand filters, thus requiring significantly less land area.  The first modern mechanical filtration plant in the U.S. was built at Little Falls, New Jersey, for the East Jersey Water Company.  George W. Fuller designed and supervised the construction of the plant which went into operation in 1902. In 1924, John R. Baylis developed a fixed grid backwash assist system, which consisted of pipes with nozzles that injected jets of water into the filter material during expansion.

See also
 Backwashing (water treatment)
 Carbon filtering
 Distillation
 Kinetic degradation fluxion media
 Point of use water filter
 Point of use water treatment
 Reverse osmosis
 Reverse osmosis plant
 Sand separator
 Settling basin
 Swimming pool sanitation
 Water softening

References

External links

Water filters
Irrigation
Hiking equipment
Water conservation